John William Skinner (26 November 1890 - 1 April 1955) was headmaster of Culford School, near Bury St Edmunds, Suffolk, England between 1924 and 1951. He was the author of several books and pamphlets, including:

 (Originally School Chapel addresses from Culford School. Questions what the world would be like in 1999).

References

1890 births
Place of birth missing
1955 deaths
Place of death missing
English educational theorists
Heads of schools in England